Cansjera rheedei is a scandent shrub distributed from India, across Southeast Asia, China, Sumatra, Borneo and the Philippines. It was described by Johann Friedrich Gmelin in his work System Naturae ed. 13[bis]: 280 (1791).

References

External links

Opiliaceae
Taxa named by Johann Friedrich Gmelin